"Ring-a-Ding-Ding" is the sixth episode of the American crime comedy-drama television series Terriers. The episode was written by Angela Kang, and directed by Billy Gierhart. It was first broadcast on FX in the United States on October 13, 2010.

The series is set in Ocean Beach, San Diego and focuses on ex-cop and recovering alcoholic Hank Dolworth (Donal Logue) and his best friend, former criminal Britt Pollack (Michael Raymond-James), who both decide to open an unlicensed private investigation business. In the episode, Hank and Britt are hired by a marriage to find a missing ring, which was actually given away by the husband to his lover. Meanwhile, Katie goes on a night out with her vet school professor.

According to Nielsen Media Research, the episode was seen by an estimated 0.506 million household viewers and gained a 0.2/1 ratings share among adults aged 18–49. The episode received extremely positive reviews from critics, who praised the humor, character development and performances.

Plot
Hank (Donal Logue), Britt (Michael Raymond-James), Katie (Laura Allen), and Steph (Karina Logue) attend Gretchen's (Kimberly Quinn) engagement party, with Jason (Loren Dean) remarking that he may have previously met Britt. Britt confides in Hank that he intends to propose marriage to Katie.

Maggie (Jamie Denbo) returns from her maternal leave and puts Hank and Britt in contact with a marriage. The wife, Beth Komack (Stacy Edwards), is dying in the hospital and wants them to find a ring for her son, suspecting that her maid's brother is responsible. As they leave, the husband Dale (Chris Bruno) tells them that he gave the ring to his lover, Paolo (T Lopez), as Beth was supposed to die earlier. As her condition improved, Paolo broke up with Dale and won't return the ring.

Hank and Britt visit Paolo's beauty parlor, claiming to be regular customers. However, Paolo correctly deduces that Dale sent them and kicks them out, also revealing that she sold the ring. They visit the establishment where she sold it, only to realize that the owner also sold it already. As they go through many re-sellers, they eventually find that a woman named Elizabeth Komack bought the ring. Elizabeth is revealed to be Beth, who deduced that her husband was cheating on her. She wants to know the name of Dale's lover to change her will and make things easier for her son. After they provide it to her, she asks them to get the ring from her house.

As Hank distracts Dale, Britt sneaks into the house and retrieves the ring from a Bible, also discovering that Beth's wigs come from the same beauty parlor where Paolo works. Dale then receives a call, notifying him that Beth has left the hospital and that Hank and Britt were the last people to see her. They find her at the beauty parlor, confronting Paolo. As Dale enters, a child pops out of the backdoor, recognizing Dale as her father. Heartbroken, Beth asks them to leave while she cries in the parlor, eventually being sent back to the hospital. Meanwhile, Katie decides to go out with her vet school professor, Owens (Johnny Sneed), to a bar. Amidst heavy drinking, they sing Karaoke and later have sex. Realizing what she has done, she leaves as soon as she wakes up. She returns home, where she evades Britt's questions.

Jason talks with Hank, explaining that he knows that Britt robbed his wallet earlier and deduces Hank asked him to do it. Despite that, he is not mad at him, explaining that he still likes him but also wants to reiterate to him that he and Gretchen are getting married and Hank must deal with that. The next day, Katie contacts Hank to meet her. She informs him about sleeping with her professor and is feeling terrible about it. Hank consoles her but tells her that she can't tell Britt about it. Despite her cries, she agrees to not tell him.

Reception

Viewers
The episode was watched by 0.506 million viewers, earning a 0.2/1 in the 18-49 rating demographics on the Nielson ratings scale. This means that 0.2 percent of all households with televisions watched the episode, while 1 percent of all households watching television at that time watched it. This was a 4% increase in viewership from the previous episode, which was watched by 0.486 million viewers with a 0.2/1 in the 18-49 rating demographics.

Critical reviews
"Ring-a-Ding-Ding" received extremely positive reviews from critics. Noel Murray of The A.V. Club gave the episode a "B+" grade and wrote, "What does this have to do with the conspiracy to commit soil-test fraud at The Montague? Nada. But as a story about how the legal obligations of marriage conflict with and complicate the romantic passions of the same, 'Ring-A-Ding-Ding' is on-point. Because while Hank and Britt are working this case together, separately each is having his own little relationship melodrama."

Alan Sepinwall of HitFix wrote, "Terriers has put the Lindus/Montague mess on pause for a while, but I actually found 'Ring-a-Ding-Ding' to be one of the strongest episodes yet. The writers keep pushing the character arcs along even as Hank and Britt work a standalone case, and the more we get to know these people, the more we care about them – and the more it hurts when something happens like Katie's slip after karaoke night."

Matt Richenthal of TV Fanatic gave the episode a perfect 5-star rating out of 5 and wrote, "In just a handful of weeks, Terriers has introduced us to layered characters and a tone unlike anything else on TV. It can oscillate between comedic and dramatic from commercial break to commercial break, feeling entirely organic as it goes on." Cory Barker of TV Overmind wrote, "With Mad Men and Rubicon leaving the air this Sunday, it looks as though Terriers gets the 'Best Series on TV' belt. And I'm not sure anything airing now or coming on in the next few months can take it away."

References

External links
 

2010 American television episodes
Terriers episodes
Television episodes directed by Billy Gierhart